The 2005–06 Duke Blue Devils men's basketball team represented Duke University. The head coach was Mike Krzyzewski. The team played its home games in the Cameron Indoor Stadium in Durham, North Carolina, and was a member of the Atlantic Coast Conference.

Recruiting

Roster

Schedule

|-
!colspan=9 style=|Regular Season

|-
!colspan=12 style=| ACC Tournament

|-
!colspan=12 style=| NCAA tournament

Regular season

North Carolina

Wake Forest

JJ Redick set the NCAA record for career three-pointers made.

NCAA basketball tournament
South
Duke 70, Southern 54
Duke 74, George Washington 61
Louisiana State 62, Duke 54

Awards and honors

 JJ Redick, Adolph Rupp Trophy
 JJ Redick, ACC Men's Basketball Player of the Year
 JJ Redick, Naismith College Player of the Year
 JJ Redick, USBWA College Player of the Year
 JJ Redick, John R. Wooden Award
 Shelden Williams, NABC Defensive Player of the Year

Team players drafted into the NBA

References

External links
Statistical Database- Duke Blue Devils Basketball Statistical Database

Duke Blue Devils men's basketball seasons
Duke Blue Devils
Duke
Duke
Duke